Shahrak-e Jadid Ardali (also Romanized as Shahrak-e Jadīd Ard‘alī; also known as Shahrak-e Ard‘alī) is a village in Hasanabad Rural District, Hasanabad District, Eqlid County, Fars Province, Iran. At the 2006 census, its population was 159, in 40 families.

References 

Populated places in Eqlid County